King John may refer to:

Rulers
 John, King of England (1166–1216)
 John I of Jerusalem (c. 1170–1237)
 John Balliol, King of Scotland (c. 1249–1314)
 John I of France (15–20 November 1316)
 John II of France (1319–1364)
 John I of Aragon (1350–1396)
 John I of Castile (1358–1390)
 John II of Aragon (1398–1479)
 John II of Castile (1405–1454)
 John, King of Denmark, Norway and Sweden 1415–1500
 John, King of Bohemia and titular King of Poland (1296–1346)
 John III of France (1874–1940), titular king of France
 John of Poland (disambiguation), various kings
 John of Portugal (disambiguation), various kings
 John of Sweden (disambiguation), various kings

Other people
 Rex Brough or King John (born 1960), English record producer and radio editor
 Murlawirrapurka, an Aboriginal man in colonial South Australia known as "King John"; see Rymill Park

Drama
 King John (play), a play by William Shakespeare
 King John (film), an 1899 British silent film
 King John (2015 film), a production of CBC Presents the Stratford Festival
 Kynge Johan, a play by John Bale
 The Life and Death of King John (1984), on BBC Television Shakespeare

See also

 
 
 John I (disambiguation)
 John II (disambiguation)
 John III (disambiguation)
 John IV (disambiguation)
 John V (disambiguation)
 John VI (disambiguation)
 John VII (disambiguation)
 John VIII (disambiguation)
 John IX (disambiguation))